Rufus Kay Hardy (May 28, 1878 – March 7, 1945) was a prominent missionary for the Church of Jesus Christ of Latter-day Saints in New Zealand and was a general authority of the LDS Church from 1935 until his death.

Hardy was born in Salt Lake City, Utah Territory. In 1897, church apostle John Henry Smith ordained Hardy to be a seventy and set him apart to be a missionary in New Zealand. Hardy served in New Zealand as a church missionary from 1897 to 1901. Hardy would return to New Zealand twice as the president of the church's New Zealand Mission from 1907 to 1909 and from 1933 to 1934.

In 1935, Hardy became a member of the church's First Council of the Seventy, and served in this position until his death in Salt Lake City from myocarditis. He was married to Adelaide Underwood Eldredge and was the father of one daughter.

Notes

References
 Andrew Jenson. Latter-day Saint Biographical Encyclopedia, 1:236; 4:97 & 360

External links
Grampa Bill's G.A. Pages: Rufus K. Hardy

1878 births
1945 deaths
19th-century Mormon missionaries
20th-century Mormon missionaries
American Mormon missionaries in New Zealand
American general authorities (LDS Church)
Latter Day Saints from Utah
Mission presidents (LDS Church)
People from Salt Lake City
Presidents of the Seventy (LDS Church)